Enoch Lincoln (December 28, 1788 – October 8, 1829) was an American politician, serving as  U.S. Representative from, successively, Massachusetts and from Maine. He was the son of Levi Lincoln Sr. and his wife, and the younger brother of Levi Lincoln Jr.  Born in Worcester, Massachusetts, Lincoln graduated from Harvard College in 1807. He was elected and served as Governor of Maine from 1827 until his death in October 1829.

He studied law, was admitted to the bar, and started his practice in Salem in 1811.  He served as United States district attorney 1815–1818, and in 1819 moved to Paris, Maine (then a district of Massachusetts), and continued the practice of law.

In November 1818, Lincoln was elected as a Democratic-Republican-MA, representing the Maine district, to the Fifteenth Congress to fill the vacancy caused by the resignation of Albion K. Parris.  He was reelected to the Sixteenth Congress and served in total from November 4, 1818, to March 3, 1821.

Lincoln was elected a member of the American Antiquarian Society in 1819.  A portion of his business and personal papers resides in the manuscript collections of the AAS within the Lincoln Family Papers.

Upon the admission of Maine as a state, Lincoln was elected as a Democratic-Republican from Maine  to the Seventeenth Congress. He was reelected to the Eighteenth Congress, but as an Adams-Clay Republican. Finally he was elected as a Pro-Adams candidate to the Nineteenth Congress and served from March 4, 1821, until his resignation some time in 1826. He served as Governor of Maine from 1827 until his death. He won three terms, all with more than 90% of the vote. He did not run for a fourth term.

Lincoln died in Augusta, Maine, on October 8, 1829, before his term expired, and after the election of his successor Jonathan G. Hunton. Two Presidents of the Maine Senate, Nathan Cutler and Joshua Hall, had to serve as lame-duck successors between the two men. Lincoln was interred in a mausoleum in Capitol Park, directly opposite the Maine State House.

The town of Lincoln, Maine, is named for him.

Lincoln was distantly related to President Abraham Lincoln, sharing common ancestor Samuel Lincoln, who had settled in Hingham, Massachusetts, in the 17th century.

External links
  The Lincoln Family Papers, the American Antiquarian Society

References

1788 births
1829 deaths
Members of the United States House of Representatives from Maine
Governors of Maine
Harvard College alumni
People from Paris, Maine
People from Worcester, Massachusetts
Lincoln family
Lincoln, Maine
American Congregationalists
Maine Democratic-Republicans
Massachusetts Democratic-Republicans
Maine National Republicans
Democratic-Republican Party members of the United States House of Representatives from the District of Maine
National Republican Party members of the United States House of Representatives from Massachusetts
Democratic-Republican Party state governors of the United States
Members of the American Antiquarian Society
19th-century American politicians
Burials in Maine